Alisan Leigh Porter (born June 20, 1981) is an American pop, rock & country singer, actress, and dancer. As a child, Porter made acting appearances in Parenthood, Stella and I Love You to Death. Her breakout role came in 1991, when she played the lead in the film Curly Sue opposite Jim Belushi.

As an adult, Porter pursued roles in musical theatre, including a run in The Ten Commandments: The Musical and as an original cast member of the Broadway revival of A Chorus Line. A solo album followed in 2009. In 2016, she auditioned for NBC's The Voice, earning a spot on Team Christina. In May of that same year, Porter was named the winner of season 10.

Life and career
Born to Jewish parents in Worcester, Massachusetts, Porter is the great-granddaughter of prominent Worcester rabbi Joseph Klein. Her grandmother ran the Charlotte Klein Dance Center. Porter's father, Ric Porter, was co-founder, lead singer, and songwriter of the Worcester-based band Zonkaraz. Her mother, Laura Klein, also taught dance, coaching Diane and Elaine Klimaszewski, who appeared on Star Search in 1987 in the junior dance category before they became known as the Coors Light Twins. While in Los Angeles for the twins' appearance on Star Search, the show's producer heard Porter singing in the hotel lobby and booked her to appear on the next episode. Porter has been singing and performing since age three; at age five, she became the youngest Star Search participant ever to win the competition. That same year, she also appeared on Pee Wee's Playhouse as one of the playhouse gang in Season 2.

Porter acted in several films as a child; she became known for playing the title role in the 1991 movie Curly Sue opposite Jim Belushi. On television, she played the youngest daughter of Lynn Redgrave on the short-lived ABC sitcom Chicken Soup in 1989. The following year, she was slated to be a new regular cast member on Perfect Strangers, but her character was dropped after only one episode.

Porter continued acting at Staples High School in Westport, Connecticut, where she joined a theater group and participated in various shows. While a freshman, Porter portrayed Anita in West Side Story, and as a senior played the lead in Cinderella. After Porter won The Voice in 2016, her former high school drama teacher said she was not surprised by the result. "She blew everybody away" with her performance in West Side Story, and "really seemed to get the best out of everybody else. Her energy rubbed off on everybody. She inspired others."

When she was 18 years old, Porter moved to New York to audition for Broadway shows. She was cast as Urleen in the show Footloose. Following her move to Los Angeles, Porter starred as Miriam in The Ten Commandments: The Musical at the Kodak Theatre alongside Val Kilmer, Adam Lambert and Broadway star Lauren Kennedy. Variety rated her performance of the song "Light of a New Day" as "superb".

In 2003, the band The Raz was formed, with Porter as the vocalist and main songwriter. The Raz split up in 2004. In March 2005, she announced the birth of her new band, The Alisan Porter Project. During 2006, she performed in the revival of A Chorus Line as Bebe Benzenheimer at the Gerald Schoenfeld Theatre in New York City. On October 9, 2009, her independent debut album Alisan Porter was released.

Porter sang the National Anthem at the 2016 A Capitol Fourth special on July 3 at the U.S. Capitol West Lawn in Washington, D.C. The special was broadcast on PBS. She also sang the anthem prior to the nationally televised Sunday Night Football game in Oakland, CA on November 6, 2016.

In 2017, Porter, alongside Matt McAndrew, Mary Sarah, Chris Mann, Matthew Schuler, Michael Sanchez and Chloe Kohanski headlined the new Las Vegas show called The Voice: Neon Dreams.

The Voice (2016)
On February 29, 2016, she became a contestant on season 10 of The Voice and sang "Blue Bayou" for her blind audition performance. All four coachesChristina Aguilera, Adam Levine, Blake Shelton, and Pharrell Williamsturned their chairs for her and she chose Aguilera as her coach. In the battle rounds, Porter was up against Lacy Mandigo with the song "California Dreamin'" by The Mamas & the Papas as a rock version. In the knockout rounds, Porter beat Daniel Passino. Porter went on to sing through the live shows, advancing via public vote every week up to the finals, where she performed her original song "Down That Road". On May 24, 2016, Porter was crowned the season 10 winner of The Voice. She also helped make The Voice US history as the first artist to win the show with a female coach, giving Aguilera her first win as a coach.

← Studio version reached the top 10 on iTunes.

Personal life
Porter has openly discussed her battles with alcoholism and drug addiction. She says she has been sober since October 28, 2007.

Since December 2008, Porter is a contributing columnist for movmnt magazine. Porter created a closed Facebook page for mothers called Lil' Mamas and then, in 2012, a related blog website of the same name that she runs with her business partner, Celia Behar.

On March 10, 2012, Porter married Brian Autenrieth, a fruit exporter and former child soap opera actor, in California. The couple have two children: son Mason Blaise (b. July 17, 2012) and daughter Aria Sage Autenrieth (b. May 8, 2014).  On December 18, 2017, Porter announced on Twitter that the couple had separated in March. She said, "In a sad and honest note Brian and I ended our relationship in March. We remain close friends and are committed to always doing our best for our amazing kids."

On October 20, 2021, Porter gave birth to her third child, daughter Shilo Bee with her boyfriend, professional dancer Justin de Vera.

Filmography

Film

Television

Discography

Albums

EP's

Releases from The Voice

Albums

Singles

Other works

Porter co-wrote the following songs:
 Adam Lambert – For Your Entertainment (2009)
 Aftermath (Adam Lambert, Alisan Porter, Ferras, Ely Rise)
 Scarlett Cherry – Labor of Love (2011)
 Angel (Alisan Porter, Ely Rise, Scarlett Cherry, Lee Cherry, Guy Baruch)
 Sleep Until You Dream (Alisan Porter, IIsey Juber, Jordan Lawhead, Scarlett Cherry, Lee Cherry)
 Never Knew Love (Alisan Porter, Ely Rise, Scarlett Cherry, Lee Cherry)

Porter appears on the 2006 Revival Cast Recording of A Chorus Line, portraying Bebe Benzenheimer, whom she also portrayed on Broadway.

Awards and nominations

References

External links

 
 Audition at The Voice

1981 births
20th-century American actresses
20th-century American singers
21st-century American actresses
Actresses from Worcester, Massachusetts
Actresses from Connecticut
American child actresses
American women country singers
American country singer-songwriters
American child singers
American film actresses
American stage actresses
American television actresses
Jewish American actresses
Jewish American musicians
Living people
Musicians from Worcester, Massachusetts
People from Westport, Connecticut
Singer-songwriters from Massachusetts
The Voice (franchise) winners
Singer-songwriters from New York (state)
20th-century American women singers
21st-century American singers
21st-century American women singers
Country musicians from New York (state)
Staples High School alumni
21st-century American Jews
Singer-songwriters from Connecticut